András Tölcséres (born 28 November 1974) is a Hungarian football player.

After coming through the ranks at Hungarian team Szegedi SC, Tölcséres moved to Germany where he joined FC Starnberg before moving to 1. FC Nürnberg II. He then went on to play for SG Quelle Fürth and 1. FC Saarbrücken before spending four years at Regionalliga-Süd team SSV Jahn Regensburg, scoring 37 goals from 120 appearances. Just one season after Regensburg's promotion to Germany's 2. Bundesliga, they were relegated back to the Regionalliga. Tölcséres followed in the mass exodus which many players leave. He then joined fellow Bavarian outfit FC Augsburg in time for the 2004–05 season, where he scored two goals from 20 appearances, twelve of which coming from the bench. After four years at FC Ingolstadt 04 he moved to Türk. SV Ingolstadt as player-manager.

References

External links 
 

1974 births
Living people
Hungarian footballers
Association football forwards
2. Bundesliga players
1. FC Nürnberg II players
1. FC Saarbrücken players
SSV Jahn Regensburg players
FC Augsburg players
FC Ingolstadt 04 players
Expatriate footballers in Germany
FC Ingolstadt 04 II players